WYBT (1000 AM) is a radio station broadcasting an oldies format. It is licensed to Blountstown, Florida, United States, and serves the Panama City area. The station is owned by La Promesa Foundation of Midland, Texas.

References

External links

YBT
YBT
Radio stations established in 1962
1962 establishments in Florida